Kenneth Bernard Stone, Jr. (born September 14, 1950), is a former professional American football safety who played eight seasons in the National Football League for the Buffalo Bills, Washington Redskins, Tampa Bay Buccaneers, and the St. Louis Cardinals.  He played college football at Vanderbilt University and was drafted in the tenth round of the 1973 NFL Draft.

References

1950 births
Living people
American football safeties
Vanderbilt Commodores football players
Buffalo Bills players
Washington Redskins players
Tampa Bay Buccaneers players
St. Louis Cardinals (football) players
Forest Hill Community High School alumni
Players of American football from Cincinnati